Jinzhou City Stadium is a multi-use stadium in Jinzhou, Liaoning, China. It is currently used mostly for football matches and athletics events. The stadium has a capacity of 24,000 people.

Sports venues in Liaoning
Football venues in China